Corporal Mat Aznan bin Awang (28 December 1960 – 4 October 1993) was a Malaysian Army soldier who served in the Malaysian Battilion (MALBATT) of the United Nations Operation in Somalia II (UNOSOM II). Mat Aznan was posthumously awarded the Seri Pahlawan Gagah Perkasa (SP) for his actions during the Battle of Mogadishu on October 1993. He was a Royal Malay Regiment soldier and hailed from Kampung Parit Panjang, Baling, Kedah.

Battle of Mogadishu 
On October 4, 1993, Mat Aznan was involved in the rescue mission of seventy US Rangers and five members of the US Air Force who were surrounded in the Bakaara Market area of Mogadishu, Somalia.

During the rescue operation, Mat Aznan acted as a driver of a Condor Armoured Personnel Carrier (APC).

While in transit, the rescue convoy was ambushed and the armored car driven by him was shot at by anti-tank weapons from the front. This penetrated the bullet-proof window, killing him and wounding nine others.

In this incident, four Condor APC vehicles were destroyed. However, the rescue efforts of US military personnel was successfully executed by MALBATT.

Honours
Mat Aznan Awang was awarded the Seri Pahlawan Gagah Perkasa (SP) from the 10th Yang di-Pertuan Agong, Almarhum Tuanku Jaafar of Negeri Sembilan on 4 June 1994. He was posthumously promoted to Corporal by the Malaysian Army.

Legacy
One of Mat Aznan's daughters continues the legacy by serving in the same battalion.

References

Malaysian military personnel
1993 deaths
Malaysian Muslims
Malaysian people of Malay descent
People from Kedah
Recipients of the Grand Knight of Valour
Battle of Mogadishu (1993)
1960 births